James Andrew Corrine, better known by his stage name DJ Felli Fel, is an American club and radio DJ for Los Angeles's Power 106, record producer, and hype man. He is also a member of The Heavy Hitters DJs.

His debut single, "Get Buck in Here" (featuring Akon, Puff Daddy, Ludacris, and Lil Jon), was released in 2007 and peaked at number 41 on the Billboard Hot 100. Its success lead to a record deal with So So Def and Island Urban Music.

Biography 
DJ Felli Fel was born in Rock Hill, South Carolina and grew up in Atlanta, Los Angeles, and Dallas. While a teenager in Dallas, he began spinning turntables for house parties. His radio career began on Dallas radio station K104 and Waco, Texas Spanish-language station KHCK. Later, he joined the Los Angeles hip-hop station Power 106. At Power 106, he hosts the Felli Fel Show on Saturday evenings.

He had a cameo role as himself in the 2003 film Malibu's Most Wanted. In 2007, he signed with Island Def Jam/So So Def. His debut album for the label is tentatively titled Go DJ!. Singles for the album included "Finer Things" with Jermaine Dupri, Kanye West, Fabolous, and Ne-Yo; "Get Buck in Here" with Diddy, Akon, Lil Jon, and Ludacris; and "Feel It" with Sean Paul, Pitbull, Flo Rida, and T-Pain. DJ Felli Fel was also featured on the soundtrack of the game Midnight Club: Los Angeles, with his song "Get Buck in Here". He released the single "Boomerang" featuring Pitbull, Akon, and Jermaine Dupri. The track has been remixed by DJ Vice in 2011.

On April 22, 2013, he released his brand new single to iTunes titled "Reason To Hate" which features singer Ne-Yo and rappers Tyga and Wiz Khalifa. It was co-produced by Ned Cameron.

Felli is currently a member of The Americanos, a DJ group from Los Angeles whose singles "BlackOut" and "In My Foreign" have been featured in films ("BlackOut" was featured in We Are Your Friends and Office Christmas Party and "In My Foreign" was featured in XXX: Return of Xander Cage).

Discography

Studio albums

Filmography 
School Dance as Himself

Malibu's Most Wanted as Himself

Singles

As lead artist

As featured artist

Production credits 

2001 "I Like Them Girls (Power Mix)" (Tyrese featuring Bosco)
2001 "World Wide (Remix)" (Outlawz featuring 2Pac and T-Low)
2002 "A Piece of Me" (Luniz featuring Fat Joe)
2003 "Bomba" (Felli Fel from the motion picture Malibu's Most Wanted)
2004 "Back it up" (Young Rome)
2004 "It's All Right" (Guerilla Black)
2004 "Intro" (Cassidy)
2006 "On Bail" (Xzibit featuring T-Pain, The Game and Daz Dillinger)
2006 "That Ain't Right" (Sean Kingston)
2006 "Like That" (Noelle featuring Felli Fel from the motion picture Employee of the Month)
2007 "Don't Stop" (Baby Bash featuring Keith Sweat)
2007 "Take You There" (Sean Kingston)
2008 "Live It Up! (DJ Felli Fel Remix)" (Roscoe Umali featuring E-40 and Bobby V)
2008 "Died in Your Arms" (Smitty featuring T-Pain)
2008 "Died in Your Arms" (Remix) (Smitty featuring T-Pain, Junior Reid and Rick Ross)
2008 "Cinematic" (Jessi Malay featuring DJ Felli Fel)
2008 "The Money" (R. Kelly featuring Fat Joe)
2008 "Jolly Rancher" (Tino Cochino)
2009 "Diamonds & Patron" (Tino Cochino featuring Paul Wall, DJ Felli Fel and DJ Class)
2009 "Dizzy" (Frankie J)
2009 "One Night" (New Boyz) 
2009 "Loaded" (Jeremy Green featuring Ya Boy) 
2012 "Dirty Martini" (Collins Pennie)
2013 "Lighters" (50 Cent featuring Chris Brown)

Awards

References

External links 
 
 
 DJ Felli Fel at Power 106
 DJ Felli Fel at Mix Matters
 DJ Felli Fel at SKAM Artist

Year of birth missing (living people)
Living people
American hip hop record producers
American hip hop DJs
Island Records artists
Musicians from Atlanta
Musicians from Dallas
Musicians from Los Angeles
People from Rock Hill, South Carolina
So So Def Recordings artists
Record producers from Texas
Record producers from California
American curators